Takasuke (written: ,  or ) is a masculine Japanese given name. Notable people with the name include:

, Japanese poet
, Japanese footballer
, Japanese mixed martial artist

Japanese masculine given names